Walk of Fame of Italian sport is the Walk of Fame of the Italian sport, inaugurated by Italian National Olympic Committee (CONI) on 7 May 2015. It is a list of 125 Italian all-time champions, which has been implemented on five occasions (five new entries in 2015, 2016 and 2021, seven in 2018, three in 2019), from the initial 100 names.

Criteria
One hundred timeless champions, chosen on the basis of the exclusive decisions of the Coni (president Gianni Malagò), Athletes Commission - chaired by Marco Durante.

Naturally, athletes still in competitive activity are not included in the list.

The path
The Walk of Fame of Italian sport is a road path in Rome with plaques dedicated to former Italian sports athletes who have distinguished themselves internationally. It runs between the Avenue of the Olympics and the Stadio Olimpico in the Olympic Park of the Foro Italico of the capital.

The list
First 100 names of the list were inducted on 7 May 2015.

| width="80%" align="left" valign="top" |

|  style="text-align:left; width:80%; vertical-align:top;"|

See also
 FIDAL Hall of Fame
 Italian Football Hall of Fame

Footnotes

References

External links
 Walk of Fame update to 125 athletes at 9 April 2021 at CONI 

Walks of fame
All-sports halls of fame
Halls of fame in Italy
Sport in Italy